Bienvenido "Ben" Manga Ubenga (born 11 February 1974) is an Equatoguinean-German former footballer who played as a midfielder. He is currently technical director of Watford.

Career
Manga was born in Bata. He managed three scoreless Bundesliga appearances for Fortuna Düsseldorf in the 1995–96 season.

In July 2016, Manga was appointed Chief Scout of Eintracht Frankfurt, a role in which he held until 2021 when he also took on the role of Director of Football. On 30 November 2022, he departed the club by mutual consent.

On 22 December 2022, Manga was appointed technical director of EFL Championship club Watford.

Personal life
He lives in the German city of Aachen and also holds German citizenship. Manga also worked as an auto mechanic. He has a cousin, Juan Oburu, who plays for TV Jahn Hiesfeld.

References

External links
 Ben Manga at Alemannia Aachen official website 

1974 births
Living people
People from Bata, Equatorial Guinea
Equatoguinean footballers
Association football midfielders
Equatorial Guinea international footballers
Equatoguinean emigrants to Germany
Naturalized citizens of Germany
Bundesliga players
2. Bundesliga players
Fortuna Düsseldorf players
Wuppertaler SV players
KFC Uerdingen 05 players
Alemannia Aachen players
Karlsruher SC players
Wormatia Worms players
Association football scouts
German footballers
German people of Equatoguinean descent
German sportspeople of African descent
Eintracht Frankfurt non-playing staff
Watford F.C. non-playing staff